Moromorpha is a genus of stink bugs in the family Pentatomidae. There is one described species in Moromorpha, M. tetra.

References

Further reading

 
 
 

Articles created by Qbugbot
Pentatomini